Taxadiene (taxa-4,11-diene) is a diterpene.  Taxadiene is the first committed intermediate in the synthesis of taxol. Six hydroxylation reactions, and a few others, are needed to convert taxadiene to baccatin III.

Enzymatically, taxadiene is produced from geranylgeranyl pyrophosphate by taxadiene synthase. A biochemical gram-scale production of taxadiene has been reported in 2010 using genetically engineered Escherichia coli.

References

Dienes
Taxanes
Diterpenes